Cedrim e Paradela (Portuguese: União de Freguesia de Cedrim e Paradela) is a parish in Sever do Vouga, Aveiro District, Portugal. The population in 2011 was 1,554, in an area of 18.37 km2.

References

Freguesias of Sever do Vouga